Marcelino Elena Sierra (born 26 September 1971), known simply as Marcelino, is a Spanish former professional footballer who played as a central defender.

Club career

Sporting and Mallorca
Marcelino was born in Gijón, Asturias, and began his career at local club Sporting de Gijón, where he appeared sporadically with the first team over three seasons before earning a move to RCD Mallorca in January 1996. There, he was instrumental in a promotion to La Liga, forming a formidable partnership with Iván Campo in 1997–98 as they finished fifth.

In the following season the Balearic Islands side finished third in the league and lost the UEFA Cup Winners' Cup final to S.S. Lazio, with Marcelino featuring the full 90 minutes in the 2–1 defeat.

Newcastle United
In 1999, Marcelino transferred to Newcastle United for £5.8 million after impressing with Mallorca in Spain and Europe. A lot was expected of him at his new team, but he appeared only 20 times (all competitions) for the club in the first year and a half, being placed with the reserve team for the rest of his spell and finally reaching an agreement to leave in January 2003, having not featured for the main squad since 11 February 2001, against Charlton Athletic.

Marcelino also suffered several different injuries during his time with the Magpies, which stuttered his career there. Scans on the affected areas were occasionally declared to be inconclusive, the most serious of his injuries being a snapped finger tendon which prevented him from playing for two months.

Later years
After one and a half seasons in Segunda División with Polideportivo Ejido, Marcelino retired. He subsequently spent two years as Everton's Spanish scout, and also worked as a football commentator for RTVE's Premier League matches.

Marcelino later worked as a football agent.

International career
Marcelino earned five caps for Spain over a seven-month period, the first coming against Italy in Salerno on 18 November 1998. He would play his last international in an UEFA Euro 2000 qualifier rout of San Marino (9–0 home win, 90 minutes played).

Honours
Mallorca
Supercopa de España: 1998
Copa del Rey runner-up: 1997–98
UEFA Cup Winners' Cup runner-up: 1998–99

References

External links

1971 births
Living people
Spanish footballers
Footballers from Gijón
Association football defenders
La Liga players
Segunda División players
Segunda División B players
Sporting de Gijón B players
Sporting de Gijón players
RCD Mallorca players
Polideportivo Ejido footballers
Premier League players
Newcastle United F.C. players
Spain international footballers
Spanish expatriate footballers
Expatriate footballers in England
Spanish expatriate sportspeople in England